Harpal Singh Cheema (born 10 February 1974) is an Aam Aadmi Party MLA from Dirba Assembly constituency located in Sangrur District, Punjab. In March 2022, he became first dalit to be a finance minister of Punjab. 
He joined the Aam Aadmi Party just before the 2017 Punjab Legislative Assembly election. He contested and won the election from Dirba Assembly constituency against a popular Punjabi Kabbadi player Gulzar Singh Moonak from Shiromani Akali Dal and Ajaib Singh Ratolan from Indian National Congress. In July 2018 he was appointed leader of opposition of Punjab Legislative Assembly. He is considered as the Second-in command in the Government

Career
A graduate from Government Ranbir College, Sangrur, and having done his LLB from Punjabi University, Patiala, he also participated in student politics as the campus president of Left-leaning Students' Federation of India (SFI) while studying law. He led the Sangrur Bar Association in 2014. As a lawyer, he is also fighting AAP’s Delhi MLA Naresh Yadav’s case in the district courts over accusations of Quran desecration in Malerkotla in 2016.

Member of Legislative Assembly 2017-22
In a triangular fight from Dirba, he defeated Congress candidate Ajaib Singh Ratol and Shiromani Akali Dal’s Gulzar Singh.

In 2017-18 he was in the Punjab Assembly committee on government assurances. From 2017 to 2019, he was in the committee on welfare of Scheduled Castes and Scheduled Tribes and Other Backward Class.
Committee assignments of Punjab Legislative Assembly
Member (2017–18) Committee on Government Assurances
Member (2017–19) Committee on Welfare of Scheduled Castes, Scheduled Tribes and Backward Classes

Leader of opposition
In Fifteenth Punjab Legislative Assembly Aam Aadmi Party was the main opposition party. Since July 2018, Cheema served as the  leader of opposition with Saravjit Kaur Manuke as the deputy leader of opposition. His term as the leader of the opposition ended with the dissolution of the Fifteenth Punjab assembly on 11 March 2022. The dissolution was necessitated after the results of the election were declared on 10 March.

Member of Legislative Assembly 2022-27
He was elected as the MLA in the 2022 Punjab Legislative Assembly election. He represented the Dirba Assembly constituency in the Punjab Legislative Assembly. Cheema took oath as a cabinet minister along with nine other MLAs on 19 March at Guru Nanak Dev auditorium of Punjab Raj Bhavan in Chandigarh. The Aam Aadmi Party gained a strong 79% majority in the sixteenth Punjab Legislative Assembly by winning 92 out of 117 seats in the 2022 Punjab Legislative Assembly election. MP Bhagwant Mann was sworn in as Chief Minister on 16 March 2022.

In September 2022, Aam Aadmi Party, the ruling party in Punjab, accused BJP of spending ₹1375 Crore in Punjab to bribe the AAP MLAs under Operation Lotus. Punjab's Finance Minister Harpal Singh Cheema said in a press conference, "Our MLAs have been approached with offers of up to Rs 25 crore to break away from AAP. The MLAs were told: “bade bau ji se milwayenge”. These MLAs have also been offered big posts. They were told that if you get more MLAs along, you would be given up to Rs 75 crore."

Cabinet Minister
As a cabinet minister in the Mann ministry, Cheema was given the charge of five departments of the Punjab Government:
 Department of Finance
 Department of Planning
 Department of Programme Implementation
 Department of Excise & Taxation
 Department of Cooperation

On 5 July, Bhagwant Mann announced the expansion of his cabinet of ministers with five new ministers to the departments of Punjab state government. Cheema's charge of Cooperation ministry ended on 5 July with CM Bhagwant Mann taking the charge of the same. Cheema continued to hold the charge of following departments.
 Department of Finance
 Department of Planning
 Department of Programme Implementation
 Department of Excise & Taxation

Electoral Performance

Family
Son of Mehar Singh and Manjeet Kaur, he was born in Cheema village in Dhuri subdivision, he has five siblings, two brothers and three sisters. Now he lives in Sangrur with his wife and a daughter.

References

Living people
Members of the Punjab Legislative Assembly
Aam Aadmi Party politicians from Punjab, India
1974 births
Punjab, India MLAs 2017–2022
Punjab, India MLAs 2022–2027
Mann ministry
Finance Ministers of Punjab, India